Rosina is a surname. Notable people with the surname include:

 Alessandro Rosina (born 1984), Italian football player
 Štefan Rosina (businessman) (born 1932), Slovak tire maker
 Štefan Rosina (born 1987), Slovak racing driver